The 1998 South Carolina gubernatorial election was held on November 3, 1998 to select the governor of the state of South Carolina. Jim Hodges, the Democratic nominee, handily defeated Republican Governor David Beasley to become the 114th governor of South Carolina. Beasley was the first incumbent governor to be defeated for reelection since Daniel Henry Chamberlain in the disputed election of 1876. , this was the last time a Democrat was elected Governor of South Carolina.

Democratic primary
Jim Hodges, a state representative from the Midlands, faced no opposition from South Carolina Democrats and avoided a primary election.

Republican primary
The South Carolina Republican Party held their primary on June 9, 1998 and it was a sign of trouble that Governor David Beasley faced opposition to his reelection within his own party. Nonetheless, he easily defeated Bill Able, an attorney from Columbia, to become the Republican nominee for governor in the general election.

General election
Hodges started the campaign with a low name recognition across the state and early on it was decided by his camp to make education as their chief issue for the election. Immediately, Hodges blamed Governor Beasley for the poor SAT scores and the low achievement levels by the students of the state. Beasley was cited for his opposition to all-day kindergarten and Hodges proposed a state lottery to pay for the funding of pre-school and to also grant college scholarships. The lottery proved to be enormously popular with blacks because many could not afford to send their children to pre-school and with soccer moms who were worried by the rapidly increasing cost of higher education.

Beasley responded by trying to shift the focus of the campaign to Hodges' ties to the gambling industry. As much as 70% of the money supplied to Hodges campaign was given by the video poker operators. In addition, the Palmetto League was being financed by video poker to attack Beasley's flip-flopping on the Confederate flag issue. Hodges keenly avoided discussing the Confederate flag issue to enable him to keep the support of blacks while also attracting disaffected whites.

To tie in South Carolinians' dissatisfaction with education of the state and the Confederate flag issue, Kevin Geddings of the Hodges campaign created a series of ads featuring a character called "Bubba." Portrayed by Kerry Maher, Bubba was Georgia convenience store clerk dressed in Georgia Bulldogs garb who spoke with a thick Southern accent. The 30 second ads featured Bubba talking about how the Georgia lottery money was being used to improve schools there and the commercials would always end by Bubba saying, "Here in Georgia, we love David Beasley." Bubba was quickly elevated to celebrity status in South Carolina and was even adored by Gamecock fans when he made appearances at Williams-Brice Stadium for USC football games.

The general election was held on November 3, 1998 and Jim Hodges was decisively elected as the next governor of South Carolina. Unsurprisingly, Hodges performed extremely well in the rural counties, but it was the unexpectedly strong vote of the Lowcountry in his favor that enabled Hodges to defeat Beasley. Turnout was much less percentage-wise than the previous election because approximately a half-million new voters were added to the rolls, but many of those chose not to vote in the election.

 
 

|-
| 
| colspan=5 |Democratic gain from Republican
|-

See also
Governor of South Carolina
List of governors of South Carolina
South Carolina gubernatorial elections

External links
SCIway Biography of Governor James Hovis Hodges

Gubernatorial
1998
1998 United States gubernatorial elections